Egypt, which is represented by the Egyptian Olympic Committee (EOC), competed at the 1996 Summer Olympics in Atlanta, United States from July 19 to August 4, 1996. Twenty-nine Egyptian athletes, twenty-seven men and two women, competed in boxing, handball, judo, rowing, shooting, swimming, weightlifting, and wrestling, but the nation did not win any medals.

Background 
Prior to 1996, Egypt had sent athletes to fifteen editions of the Summer Olympic Games (three times as the United Arab Republic), the 1906 Intercalated Games, equestrian at the 1956 Summer Olympics, and the 1984 Winter Olympics. Egypt's 1996 delegation was the smallest since 1976 and chose Hosam Abdallah, an Olympic veteran in handball, as its flagbearer in the opening ceremony.

Results by event

Boxing 
Egypt qualified four boxers for the Olympic tournament. Three of them, middleweight Kabary Salem, light-heavyweight Mohamed Mahmoud, and heavyweight Amrou Moustafa had placed fifth at the 1995 World Amateur Boxing Championships. Salim had also been the light-middleweight champion at the 1991 Mediterranean Games and had competed in that category in the 1992 Olympic tournament. All three were eliminated in the first round. The fourth, super-heavyweight Ahmed El-Said, received a bye in the round of 32, and was defeated by René Monse of Germany in the round of 16.

Handball 
Egypt qualified for the men's handball tournament by placing sixth at the 1995 World Men's Handball Championship, at the time the highest-ever placement for a squad from Africa. They had also been the gold medalists at the 1995 All-Africa Games. Half of the Egyptians were veterans of the 1992 tournament: Hosam Abdallah, Ahmed El-Attar, Ashraf Mabrouk Awaad, Ahmed El-Awady, Ahmed Belal, Gohar Mohamed, Yasser Mahmoud, and Ayman Abdel Hamid Soliman. Abdallah also served as the Egyptian flagbearer in the opening ceremonies of the Games. In its first three matches, Egypt defeated Algeria 19-16, Brazil 31-20, and Germany 24-22, before losing to 25-20 to France and 20-19 to eventual silver medalists Spain, which caused them to be eliminated from the tournament. In the ranking round, the country was bested by Russia and thus finished in sixth.

Preliminary group B

5th place match

Team roster

Judo 
Egypt sent two judokas to the 1996 Olympic tournament. Bassel El Gharbawy, who competed in the half-heavyweight division, was the reigning African Champion and bronze medalist in the open division, as well as the 1994 Junior World bronze medalist. After receiving a bye in the round of 32, El Gharbawy was defeated by Raymond Stevens of Great Britain in the round of 16 and eliminated from the tournament. Heba Hefny, competing in the heavyweight category, was a veteran of the 1992 Olympic tournament, where she had lost her opening bout, and attended the 1996 Olympics as the runner-up in both the heavyweight and open classes at the 1996 African Judo Championships. She received a bye in the opening round and defeated Heidi Burnett of Australia in the quarterfinals to advance to the semifinals, where she was overcome by Beata Maksymowa of Poland. In the repechage, she lost against Christine Cicot of France, one of the upcoming bronze medalists.

Men

Women

Rowing 
Egypt entered a single rower, Ali Ibrahim, into the Olympic tournament. Ibrahim had begun his international career only a year prior and had competed exclusively in the single sculls, achieving one second-place finish at the 1995 World Rowing Cup and 17th at the 1995 World Rowing Championships. He was third in his heat in the opening round, but was second in his repechage heat, which qualified him for the semifinals, where he was fourth in his heat and missed qualifying for the "A" Final. In the "B" Final, he finished second, behind Rob Waddell, for an overall placement of eighth.

Men

Shooting
Egypt entered two shooters into the Olympic tournament, both in the skeet event. Mohamed Khorshed was a veteran of three prior Olympics, never placing higher than 33rd, but had been the gold medalist in the discipline at the 1995 All-Africa Games. He also earned gold at the 1993 African Shooting Championships and bronze at the 1995 edition.  Mostafa Hamdy, meanwhile, had been fourth and seventh at the 1993 and 1995 African Shooting Championships respectively. Khorshed and Hamdy finished 45th and 47th respectively and failed to advance to the final.

Men

Swimming 
Egypt was represented by two swimmers in the Olympic tournament. Tamer Zinhom had set national records in the 50 metre freestyle and butterfly events at the 1995 Egyptian Championships, but placed fifth in his heat and 47th overall in the 50 m freestyle event at the Games and failed to advance. He also competed in the 100 m freestyle and butterfly and was eliminated from both after finishing 47th and 46th overall respectively. Rania Elwani, a veteran of the 1992 Olympics, had won three gold medals at the 1995 All-Africa Games (in the 50, 100, and 200 metre freestyle races), in addition to silver in the 100 metre backstroke and butterfly events. She competed in the 50, 100, and 200 m freestyle events, but never advanced beyond the heats.

Men

Women

Weightlifting 
Egypt's sole representative in weightlifting was Tharwat Bendary, a veteran of two editions of the All-Africa Games and several World Weightlifting Championships. He competed in the 99 kg class, lifting 167.5 kg in the snatch and 205.0 kg in the clean and jerk for a total score of 372.5, which ranked him 11th in the tournament.

Wrestling 
Moustafa Ramada Hussain, Egypt's representative in wrestling, was the son of Mohamed Abdul Ramada Hussain, who competed at the Olympics in 1952, and the brother of Mohyeldin Ramada Hussain who had appeared at the Games in 1992. Moustafa was a veteran of the 1988 and 1992 tournaments, and competed in the Greco-Roman 90 kg division. He was defeated by Maik Bullmann of Germany, the eventual bronze medalist, in the opening round and bested Abdel Aziz Essafoui of Morocco in the first classification round before losing to Marek Švec of the Czech Republic and placing 14th overall.

Greco-Roman

References

General

Specific

Notes

Nations at the 1996 Summer Olympics
1996 Summer Olympics
1996 in Egyptian sport